The 1923–24 Prima Divisione season was won by Genoa.

Northern League
The Northern League was composed by the 24 best clubs of 1922–23 Prima Divisione.

Regular season
Group winners went to the final. Bottom clubs were relegated, while penultimate clubs went to a test-match against two clubs of the Second Division.

Group A

Classification

Results table

Group B

Classification

Results table

Finals
The finals were played after a May break due to the participation of the Italian football team to the Olympics in Paris.

Qualification play-off

Classification

Results table

Southern League

The Southern League was a separate amatorial league, still divided in five regions. The winner were Savoia from Torre Annunziata.

National Finals
1st Leg: 31 Aug 1924, *2nd Leg: 7 Sep 1924

Top goalscorers

References and sources
Almanacco Illustrato del Calcio - La Storia 1898-2004, Panini Edizioni, Modena, September 2005

Footnotes

1923-24
Prima